The Medical University of Vienna (German: Medizinische Universität Wien) is a public university located in Vienna, Austria. It is the direct successor to the faculty of medicine at the University of Vienna, founded in 1365 by Rudolf IV, Duke of Austria. As one of the oldest medical schools in the world, it is the oldest in the German-speaking countries, and was the second medical faculty in the Holy Roman Empire, after the Charles University of Prague.

The Medical University of Vienna is the largest medical organisation in Austria, as well as one of the top-level research institutions in Europe and provides Europe's largest hospital, the Vienna General Hospital, with all of its medical staff. It consists of 31 university clinics and clinical institutes, and 12 medical-theoretical departments, which perform around 48,000 operations each year. The Vienna General Hospital has about 100,000 patients treated as inpatients and 605,000 treated as outpatients each year.

There have been seven Nobel prize laureates affiliated with the medical faculty, and fifteen in total with the University of Vienna. These include Robert Bárány, Julius Wagner-Jauregg and Karl Landsteiner, the discoverer of the ABO blood type system and the Rhesus factor. Sigmund Freud qualified as a doctor at the medical faculty and worked as a doctor and lecturer at the General Hospital, carrying out research into cerebral palsy, aphasia and microscopic neuroanatomy.

In the 2014–15 Times Higher Education Rankings, the Medical University of Vienna is listed among the top 15 medical schools in Europe and 49th in the world for category of Clinical, Pre-Clinical and Health.

In 2019, there were 8,217 applicants for 660 places in medicine proper and 80 in dentistry, which corresponds to an admission rate of about 9,01% Admission is based upon ranking in an admission test called "MedAT", which is carried out every summer in conjunction with the three other public medical schools of Austria: the Medical University of Graz, the Medical University of Innsbruck and the Medical Faculty at the Johannes Kepler University Linz.

History

Founding

From the middle ages to the Age of Enlightenment
As the founding member of the Alma mater Rudolfina (University of Vienna) founded in 1365, the medical faculty was already widely renowned in medieval times as an authority in medicine. Faculty records from as far back as 1399 document its mediation in disputes between barber surgeons, midwives, and local landowners. During the reign of Maria Theresia, Viennese medicine first attained international significance. The Habsburg Monarch summoned the Dutch physician, Gerard van Swieten, to Vienna. He in turn laid the foundation for the Vienna Medical School and paved the way for other leading figures. Anton de Haen, Maximilian Stoll, Lorenz Gasser, Anton von Störck, and the discoverer of the percussion technique, Leopold Auenbrugger, all taught and conducted research in the imperial city. Based on longstanding traditions, what now is referred to as "bedside teaching" also became the paradigmatic educational method during this period.

When the Vienna General Hospital opened in 1784, physicians acquired a new facility that gradually developed into the most important research center. During the 19th century, the "Second Viennese Medical School" emerged with the contributions of physicians such as Karl Rokitansky, Josef Skoda, Ferdinand von Hebra and Ignaz Philipp Semmelweis. Basic medical science expanded and specialization advanced. Furthermore, the first dermatology, eye, as well as otolaryngology clinics in the world were founded in Vienna.

At the height of the Austro-Hungarian Empire
At the beginning of the 20th century, Viennese Medicine belonged to the first class internationally. Clemens von Pirquet defined the concepts of "allergy" and "serum sickness," Ernst Peter Pick conducted significant experiments on the chemical specificity of immunological reactions, and the Vienna School of Dentistry (founded by Bernhard Gotlieb) reached its zenith in the 1920s. All four Nobel Prizes, which were granted to (former) Viennese physicians during the next decades Robert Bárány (1914), Julius Wagner-Jauregg (1927), Karl Landsteiner (1930), and Otto Loewi (1936)], were the result of work undertaken at this time. The excellent tradition and research extended well into the First Austrian Republic. Under the auspices of the Medical Association of Vienna, which was founded in Vienna, well-received postgraduate courses for doctors worldwide were organized into the 1930s.

During the Second World War
With the annexation of Austria by National Socialist Germany on 13 March 1938 the darkest phase in Viennese medicine began. More than half of the University medical instructors, mostly those of Jewish descent, and 65% of Viennese physicians were dismissed. Many renowned researchers, physicians, and students were forced to emigrate or died in concentration camps and under other tragic circumstances.

After the Second World War

In the aftermath of World War II difficult years lay ahead of the University. The past glory had faded considerably. Moreover, 75% of all university medical instructors had to be dismissed because of their moderate to heavy involvement with the National Socialist regime. They were gradually replaced by a newly trained generation of educators. This double rupture in Viennese Medicine, which occurred in just a few years, caused repercussions that lasted for long after the war.

From the Faculty of Medicine of the University of Vienna to the Medical University of Vienna

After the independence of the medical faculty as an independent institution the newly founded pure medical university could reposition itself in international research and regain international recognition. For example, in the fields of bionic reconstruction, some notable results could be achieved. A British soldier who lost his arm during the Afghanistan war received a bionic reconstruction at the department of surgery of the Vienna General Hospital.
Furthermore, the Vienna General Hospital and Medical University of Vienna are the largest centre for lung transplantation in Europe and the second-largest lung transplantation centre worldwide after the University of Pittsburgh. Up until 2009, over 1,000 lung transplants had been performed and currently about 100 transplantations are carried out per year.

The Medical University of Vienna is the reference center of Siemens for the seven Tesla magnetic resonance imaging scanner "MAGNETOM 7T". Founded in 2003, the High Field MR Centre (HFMR) acts today as a core research facility for the Medical University of Vienna. It combines basic research and development of methods with a strong focus on applications in neuroscience, musculoskeletal research, oncology and metabolism. The declared goal is to validate the potential of ultra-high field (UHF) MRI in clinical applications.

Faculty and alumni 
The Medical University of Vienna, through its history as the University of Vienna's Faculty of Medicine, has a long history of teaching and research. Some of the personalities having taught and learned at the institution are included in the following lists.

Faculty

Nobel Prize recipients

Notable faculty

Studies
Currently, there are five eligible programmes:

 Medicine
 Dentistry

Medicine and dentistry both are of a duration of six years and require higher education entrance qualification. In Austria and Switzerland this would correspond to a Matura, in Germany the Abitur or similar qualifications from other EU countries.
Language of instruction is German, but usually students are expected to be able to be fluent in English. A diploma thesis is required to graduate and can be written in German or English.

The courses of study lead to the degree of "Dr. med. univ." for medical doctors and "Dr. med. dent." for dentists, which correspond to MD in the United States or MBBS or MBChB in the United Kingdom.
Graduates have the right to move freely within the European Union and to start a specialty training.

 Medical informatics

Medical informatics is a master's degree and requires a bachelor's degree (Bologna Process) for application.

 Programme of Applied medical science
 PhD

Applied medical science and PhDs are both postdoc programmes, i.e. they require a medical degree or similar. For students of the university, the possibility is given to start the PhD programme during the medical programme.

Museum

The Museum of the Medical University is mainly housed in the "Josephinum", designed and built in 1783-1785 to house the medical-surgical academy.
The building includes a six-room collection of 1,192 wax anatomical and obstrectical models made in Florence by Clemente Susini under the supervision of Paolo Mascagni between 1784 and 1788.

References

External links 
 Medical University of Vienna

Buildings and structures in Alsergrund
1365 establishments
Healthcare in Vienna
Medical schools in Austria
Universities and colleges in Vienna